István is a Hungarian language equivalent of the name Stephen or Stefan. It may refer to:

People with the given name

Nobles, palatines and judges royal
 Stephen I of Hungary (c. 975–1038), last grand prince of the Hungarians and first king of Hungary
 Stephen Rozgonyi (died after 1440), ispán (Count) of Temes County
 Stephen III Báthory (died 1444), Palatine of Hungary
 Stephen V Báthory (1430–1493), Hungarian commander, judge royal and Voivode of Transylvania
 Stephen VIII Báthory (1477–1534), Voivode of Transylvania
 Stephen VII Báthory (1480–1530), Count of Temesvár and Palatine of Hungary 
 Stephen Báthory (1533–1586), Voivode of Transylvania, Prince of Transylvania, King of Poland and Grand Duke of Lithuania
 Stephen Báthory (1555–1605), judge royal of the Kingdom of Hungary
 Stephen Bocskai (1557–1606), Prince of Transylvania and Hungary
 Stephen Bethlen (1582–1648), Prince of Transylvania

Politicians
 István Balogh (politician) (1894–1976), Hungarian Catholic priest and anti-communist politician
 István Bethlen (1874–1946), Prime Minister of Hungary
 István Bethlen (born 1946) (1946–2018), Hungarian economist and politician
 István Bibó (1911–1979), Hungarian lawyer, civil servant, politician and political theorist
 István Bittó (1822–1903), Hungarian politician, Prime Minister of Hungary
 István Dobi (1898–1968), Hungarian politician, Prime Minister of Hungary
 István Farkas de Boldogfa (1875–1921), Hungarian nobleman and jurist
 István Friedrich (1883–1951), Hungarian politician, footballer and factory owner, Prime Minister of Hungary for three months
 István Gorove (1819–1881), Hungarian politician and cabinet minister
 István Hiller (born 1964), Hungarian politician and cabinet minister
 István Horthy (1904–1942), Hungarian World War II anti-Nazi politician and fighter pilot
 István Nagy (politician, born 1954), Hungarian politician
 István Nagy (politician, born 1967), Hungarian agrarian engineer and politician
 István Pálfi (1966–2006), Hungarian politician
 István Pásztor (politician) (born 1956), Serbian politician 
 István Széchenyi (1791–1860), Hungarian politician, political theorist and writer
 István Szent-Iványi (born 1958), Hungarian politician and diplomat
 István Tisza (1861–1918), Hungarian politician, Prime Minister, political scientist, international lawyer and macroeconomist
 István Varga (politician, born 1953), Hungarian lawyer and politician
 István Varga (politician, born 1956), Hungarian politician, economist and former Minister of National Development and Economy
 István Werbőczy (1458–1541), Hungarian legal theorist, statesman and theologian, author of the Hungarian Customary Law

Musicians and artists
 István Árkossy (born 1943), Hungarian painter and graphic artist
 István Cserháti (1954–2005), Hungarian hard rock keyboardist
 István Csók (1865–1961), Hungarian painter
 István Ferenczy (1792–1856), Hungarian sculptor
 Istvan Kantor (born 1949), Canadian performance and video artist and industrial music and electropop singer
 István Kertész (conductor) (1929–1973), Hungarian orchestral and operatic conductor
 István Kiss (sculptor) (1927–1997), Hungarian sculptor
 István Nagy (painter) (1873-1937), Hungarian painter
 István Orosz (born 1951), Hungarian painter, printmaker, graphic designer and animated film director

Authors
 István Fekete (1900–1970), Hungarian writer, author of several youth novels and animal stories
 István Küzmics (1723–1779), the most important Lutheran writer of the Slovenes in Hungary
 István Zsemlics (1840–1891), Slovene author and Catholic priest

Academics
 István Fáry (1922–1984), Hungarian mathematician
 István Gyöngy (born 1951), Hungarian mathematician
 István Hatvani (1718–1786), Hungarian mathematician
 István Hont (1947–2013), Hungarian-born British historian of economics and political thought
 István Mészáros (philosopher) (1930–2017), Hungarian Marxist philosopher
 István Perczel (born 1951), Hungarian historian

Chess players
 István Bilek (1932–2010), Hungarian chess grandmaster
 István Csom (1940–2021), Hungarian chess grandmaster and International Arbiter
 István Fazekas (1898–1967), Hungarian–British chess master

Sportspeople
 István Avar (1905–1977), football player and manager who played for both Hungary and Romania
 István Bagyula (born 1969), Hungarian retired pole vaulter
 Istvan Bakx (born 1986), Dutch footballer
 István Balogh (footballer) (1912–1992), Hungarian footballer
 István Bárány (1907–1995), Hungarian swimmer
 István Beé (born 1972), Hungarian sprint canoer
 István Déván (1890–1977), Hungarian sprinter and cross-country skier
 István Donogán (1897–1966), Hungarian discus thrower
 István Énekes (1911–1940), Hungarian boxer
 István Ferenczi (born 1977), Hungarian footballer
 István Géczi (born 1944), Hungarian football goalkeeper
 István Gulyás (1931–2000), Hungarian tennis player
 István Havasi (1930–2003), Hungarian race walker
 István Herczeg (1887–1949), Hungarian gymnast
 István Kiss (decathlete) (born 1924), Hungarian decathlete; see 1946 European Athletics Championships – Men's decathlon
 István Kiss (footballer) (born 1970), Hungarian footballer
 István Kiss (gymnast) (born 1948), Hungarian Olympic gymnast
 István Kiss (long-distance runner) (born 1940), Hungarian long-distance runner; see 1966 European Athletics Championships – Men's 5000 metres
 István Kiss (water polo) (born 1958), Hungarian former water polo player
 István Kovács (boxer) (born 1970), Hungarian retired world and Olympic champion boxer
 István Kozma (footballer) (born 1964), Hungarian former footballer
 István Kozma (wrestler) (1939–1970), Hungarian wrestler
 István Lévai (born 1957), Hungarian retired boxer
 István Major (1949–2014), Hungarian high jumper
 István Molnár (water polo) (1913–1983), Hungarian water polo player
 István Mudin (1881–1918), Hungarian athlete who competed in the throwing events and the pentathlon
 István Nagy (athlete) (born 1959), Hungarian sprinter
 István Nagy (footballer, born 1939) (1939–1999), Hungarian footballer
 István Nagy (footballer, born 1986), Hungarian footballer
 István Nyers (1924–2005), Hungarian footballer
 István Pelle (1907–1986), Hungarian gymnast
 István Rózsavölgyi (1929–2012), Hungarian middle-distance runner
 István Séllyei (1950–2020), Hungarian wrestler
 István Serényi (1911–1996), Hungarian field handball player
 István Somodi (1885–1963), Hungarian high jumper
 István Szabó (handballer) (born 1945), Hungarian handball player
 István Szabó (canoeist) (born 1950), Hungarian sprint canoer
 István Szilágyi (born 1950), Hungarian handball player
 István Sztáni (born 1937), Hungarian football manager and former player
 István Tóth (canoeist), Hungarian sprint canoer in the 1980s
 István Tóth (footballer) (1891–1945), Hungarian amateur footballer, manager and coach
 István Tóth (wrestler) (born 1951), Hungarian wrestler
 István Varga (handballer) (1943–2014), Hungarian handball player
 István Varga (judoka) (born 1960), Hungarian judoka
 István Vaskuti (born 1955), Hungarian sprint canoer
 István Verpecz (born 1987), Hungarian footballer
 István Vincze (born 1967), Hungarian football manager and former football player
 István Vituska (born 1988), Hungarian footballer

Other
 István Dobó (c. 1502–1572), Hungarian soldier and baron
 István Kiss (architect) (1857–1902), Hungarian architect
 Stephen Pongracz (1584–1619), Hungarian Jesuit priest, martyr and saint
 István Vágó (born 1949),  Hungarian television host and political activist

Hungarian masculine given names